Jamie Merisotis is president and CEO of Lumina Foundation, one of the largest private foundations in the United States whose mission is to increase the proportion of Americans with degrees, certificates, and other high-quality credentials to 60 percent by 2025. Merisotis oversees the foundation's use of a $1.2 billion endowment.

His second book, Human Work in the Age of Smart Machines, was published on October 6, 2020, by RosettaBooks.

Life and career

Prior to joining Lumina Foundation as president and CEO in 2008, Merisotis was the founding president of the Institute for Higher Education Policy, an education research and policy center. He was also the executive director of the National Commission on Responsibilities for Financing Postsecondary Education, a bipartisan commission appointed by the U.S. president and congressional leaders to address college affordability. Merisotis also helped create the Corporation for National and Community Service (AmeriCorps), serving as an adviser to senior management on issues related to the quality and effectiveness of national service initiatives.

Merisotis is a frequent source and commentator on issues related to higher education, talent development, and the future of work. His writing has appeared in The Washington Post, The New York Times, The Wall Street Journal, National Journal, Stanford Social Innovation Review, Washington Monthly, Huffington Post, Politico, Roll Call, and other publications.

Merisotis holds a bachelor's degree in political science from Bates College in Lewiston, Maine, and has served on the college’s board of trustees. 
He serves as a Governor of The Ditchley Foundation, based in the United Kingdom, and is past chairman and continuing trustee of the Council on Foundations in Washington, DC, and is a member of the board of directors for the Central Indiana Corporate Partnership. He also has served as chairman of the board for The Children’s Museum of Indianapolis, the world’s largest museum for children.

Merisotis' work includes extensive global experience as an adviser and consultant in southern Africa, the former Soviet Union, Europe and other parts of the world. Merisotis is a member of the Council on Foreign Relations.

Merisotis lives with his wife, Colleen O’Brien, and their children, Benjamin and Elizabeth, in Indianapolis.

Awards and recognition
Merisotis' 2012 book America Needs Talent, was named a Top Business Book of 2016 by Booklist.

Merisotis has received awards and honorary degrees from several colleges and universities, including Excelsior College, University of South Florida, Ivy Tech Community College of Indiana, Miami Dade College and Western Governors University.

In 2003, he received the Distinguished Young Alumni Award from Bates College; in 2001, he was recognized with the Community College Government Relations Award presented by the American Association of Community Colleges and the Association of Community College Trustees.

Merisotis was a 2005 finalist for the Brock International Prize in Education, and in 1998 he was named by Change: The Magazine of Higher Learning as one of the emerging young leaders (under the age of 45) in American higher education.

References

External links
 Lumina's Leader Sets Lofty Goals for Fund's Role in Policy Debates The Chronicle of Higher Education, 1 May 2009
 Why We Need a U.S. Department of Talent
 Member Profile from Spring 2009 issue of Philanthropy magazine
 Getting to Know Jamie Merisotis
 Talking About Talent: Jamie Merisotis on the Role of Higher Education
 Jamie Merisotis discusses his book on talent production
 Jamie Merisotis articles at The Huffington Post

American philanthropists
Bates College alumni
Living people
Year of birth missing (living people)
Western Governors University people